Robert Siegel (born 1947) is an American radio journalist, former host of NPR's All Things Considered

Robert Siegel may also refer to:

Robert Siegel (filmmaker) (born 1971), American screenwriter and film director
Robert Anthony Siegel, American novelist and professor
Robert Siegel (author) (1939–2012), American novelist and poet
Robert T. Siegel (1928–2000), American physicist
Robert A. Siegel (1913–1993), American philatelic auctioneer
Robert David Siegel, professor at Stanford University
Robert Siegel, American architect of Robert Siegel Architects
Robert H. Siegel, American architect of Gwathmey Siegel & Associates Architects

See also
Robert Sigl (born 1962), German filmmaker